Natalia Iezlovetska is a Ukrainian Paralympic athlete. She represented Ukraine at the 2016 Summer Paralympics and she won the silver medal in the women's 400 metres T20 event.

She won the silver medal in the women's 400 metres T20 event at the 2015 IPC Athletics World Championships.

She won the bronze medal in the women's 400 metres T20 event at the 2018 World Para Athletics European Championships held in Berlin, Germany.

References

External links 
 

Living people
Year of birth missing (living people)
Place of birth missing (living people)
Medalists at the 2016 Summer Paralympics
Athletes (track and field) at the 2016 Summer Paralympics
Paralympic athletes of Ukraine
Paralympic silver medalists for Ukraine
Paralympic medalists in athletics (track and field)
Ukrainian female sprinters